Norman Burt Sherry (July 16, 1931 – March 8, 2021) was an American baseball catcher, manager, and coach who played five seasons in Major League Baseball (MLB).  He played for the Los Angeles Dodgers and New York Mets from 1959 to 1963.  He batted and threw right-handed, and was noted for helping Sandy Koufax with his pitching control.  Sherry went on to coach and manage the California Angels, and also served as coach of the Montreal Expos, San Diego Padres, and San Francisco Giants.

Early life
Sherry was born in New York City on July 16, 1931.  He was the second of four sons of Harry Scharaga Sherry and Mildred "Minnie" (Walman) Sherry.  His father worked in the dry cleaning business, while his mother was employed as a seamstress and milliner.  Both sides of the family were Jewish immigrants from Russia, and his maternal great-grandfather was a rabbi.  The families escaped separately from anti-semitic pogroms.  Some of his relatives who settled in Europe were killed in the Holocaust.  His paternal grandparents, Max and Sarah Scharaga, came to the United States in 1898, and around 1920 his father changed their surname to Sherry.  The Sherry family moved to Los Angeles during the early 1930s.

Sherry attended Fairfax High School, graduating in 1950.  He was initially intending to study at the University of Southern California, having been awarded a full baseball scholarship.  He was signed as an amateur free agent by the Brooklyn Dodgers before the 1950 season.

His brother Larry Sherry also played in Major League Baseball (MLB).

Professional career 
He spent another two years in military service with the US Army in the 4th Infantry Division.

By the time he reached the Dodgers, in 1959 for a two-game "cup of coffee," he was 28 years of age and the team had moved to his home city of Los Angeles. He made the team as second-string backstop (behind John Roseboro) from 1960 through 1962.

In 1961, Sherry's advice contributed to the career turnaround of left-handed pitcher Sandy Koufax, who later became the youngest player elected to the Baseball Hall of Fame at age 36. Sherry and Koufax were the Dodger battery against the Minnesota Twins in a spring training game in Orlando, Florida, and Koufax was struggling with his control, up to then a career-long problem. After Koufax had walked the first three hitters he faced, Sherry went out to the mound and said: "'Why don’t you take something off the ball and just put it in there? Don’t try to throw it so hard. Just put it in there and let them hit it.' I went back behind the plate. Good God! He tried to ease up, and he was throwing harder than when he tried to. We came off the field, and I said, 'Sandy, I don’t know if you realize it, but you just now threw harder than when you were trying to.'"

As for Sherry, he batted .283 with eight home runs in a part-time role in 1960, His average dropped to .256 (1961), and then to .182 (1962).

The Dodgers sold Sherry's contract to the New York Mets on October 14, 1962. He batted only .136 in a career-high 63 games played (and 147 at-bats) in New York in 1963, and his major league playing career ended.

All told, in 194 games over parts of five seasons, Sherry batted .215 with 18 home runs, and .288 with runners in scoring position. He collected 107 total hits.

Manager and coach
In 1965, Sherry began his managerial career in the Dodger organization, scouted for a year with the New York Yankees, and returned to managing in the California Angels' system in 1969. He coached for the Angels in 1970 and 1971 under skipper Lefty Phillips, and returned to the minor leagues to manage their Double-A and Triple-A affiliates from 1972 through 1975 before rejoining the California coaching staff for 1976 under Dick Williams. Williams had been extremely successful in his previous terms with the Boston Red Sox and Oakland Athletics, but his cold and hard-edged demeanor did not go over well with a losing Angels club.  The Halos were 18 games under the .500 mark on July 23, 1976, when Williams was given his walking papers.

Sherry, named his replacement, salvaged the season somewhat with a 37–29 record as skipper.  That winter, the Angels signed high-profile free agents such as Bobby Grich and Joe Rudi and expected to contend in the American League West in 1977.  But the team struggled and was only 39–42 and in 5th place on July 11 when Sherry was released in favor of his third-base coach, Dave Garcia.  The firing marked the end of his major league managing career, with a career ledger of 76 wins and 71 defeats (.517). Through 2018, he was one of nine Jewish managers in MLB history. The others were Gabe Kapler, Bob Melvin, Brad Ausmus, Jeff Newman, Lou Boudreau, Lipman Pike, Larry Rothschild and Lefty Phillips. However, Sherry returned to the coaching ranks, ultimately as an "official" pitching coach, working with Williams with the Montreal Expos and San Diego Padres, and with another ex-Dodger, Roger Craig, with the San Francisco Giants.

Sherry's brothers, George and Larry Sherry, were pitchers in professional baseball.  Larry had a 11-season MLB career as a relief pitcher and was the Most Valuable Player of the 1959 World Series; he was Norm's teammate from 1959 through 1962, and on May 7, 1960, they became the first Jewish brothers to be Major League Baseball batterymates.

Later life
After retiring from baseball, Sherry returned to San Diego.  He underwent open heart surgery in November 1978, and had a heart attack less than three years later in March 1981.  He was inducted into the Southern California Jewish Sports Hall of Fame in 1994.

Sherry addressed the San Diego Jewish Film Festival as a guest speaker when it screened Jews and Baseball: An American Love Story in February 2011.  He often went to Padres games, and was present in 2014 for the 30th anniversary celebration of the team's first championship.

Sherry died on March 8, 2021, at an assisted living facility in San Juan Capistrano, California. He was 89, and died of natural causes.

See also
List of select Jewish baseball players

References

External links

1931 births
2021 deaths
American expatriate baseball people in Canada
American people of Russian-Jewish descent
Baseball players from New York (state)
Buffalo Bisons (minor league) players
California Angels coaches
California Angels managers
California Angels scouts
Fairfax High School (Los Angeles) alumni
Fort Worth Cats players
Jewish American baseball coaches
Jewish American baseball managers
Jewish American baseball players
Jewish Major League Baseball players
Los Angeles Dodgers players
Major League Baseball catchers
Major League Baseball pitching coaches
Major League Baseball third base coaches
Minor league baseball managers
Montreal Expos coaches
New York Mets players
New York Yankees scouts
Newport News Dodgers players
St. Paul Saints (AA) players
San Diego Padres coaches
San Francisco Giants coaches
Santa Barbara Dodgers players
Shreveport Captains players
Spokane Indians players
Sportspeople from Brooklyn
Baseball players from New York City
United States Army soldiers
American expatriate baseball players in the Dominican Republic
21st-century American Jews